Mark Cronin (born 1998) is an Irish Gaelic footballer who plays at club level with Nemo Rangers and at inter-county level with the Cork senior football team. He usually lines out as a forward.

Career

Cronin first played competitive Gaelic football with the Nemo Rangers club in Cork. After progressing onto the club's senior team in 2018, he has since gone on to win a Munster Club Championship title and two Cork PSFC titles. Cronin first appeared on the inter-county scene as a member of the Cork minor football team in 2017. He progressed onto the under-20 team and was at right corner-forward when Cork beat Dublin in the 2019 All-Ireland under-20 final. Cronin was first selected for the Cork senior football team for the pre-season McGrath Cup competition in 2022. He later earned inclusion on the team's National League panel.

Career statistics

Club

Inter-county

Honours

Nemo Rangers
Munster Senior Club Football Championship: 2019
Cork Premier Senior Football Championship: 2019, 2020

Cork
All-Ireland Under-20 Football Championship: 2019
Munster Under-20 Football Championship: 2019

References

2000 births
Living people
UCC Gaelic footballers
Nemo Rangers Gaelic footballers
Cork inter-county Gaelic footballers